Stephen Charles Goldin (born February 28, 1947)  is an American science fiction and fantasy author.

Biography
Goldin was born in Philadelphia, Pennsylvania.

A graduate of UCLA with a bachelor's degree in Astronomy, he worked for the U.S. Navy as a civilian space scientist before becoming a full-time writer. He has also worked as a writer and editor for the San Francisco Ball, designed and written manuals for a number of computer games, and co-taught a writing class at the California State University at Northridge. A member of the Science Fiction and Fantasy Writers of America (SFWA), he has served as editor of its SFWA Bulletin and held the position of the association's western regional director.

Goldin has been married twice, first to Kathleen Sky (from 1972 to 1982) and later to Mary Mason (from 1987 to present). He has collaborated with both in his fiction. Goldin lives in California.

Goldin's "The Last Ghost" was a 1972 nominee for the Nebula Award for best short story.

Bibliography

Series
 Family d'Alembert (based on a novella by E.E. "Doc" Smith):
 Imperial Stars (with E.E. "Doc" Smith, 1976)
 Stranglers' Moon (1976)
 The Clockwork Traitor (1977)
 Getaway World (1977)
 Appointment at Bloodstar (1978)
 The Purity Plot (1978)
 Planet of Treachery (1982)
 Eclipsing Binaries (1983)
 The Omicron Invasion (1984)
 Revolt of the Galaxy  (1985)

Agents of ISIS (loosely based on Family D'Alembert but entirely the authors)
 Tsar Wars (2010)
 Treacherous Moon (2010)
 Robot Mountain (2010)
 Sanctuary Planet (2010)
 Stellar Revolution (2010)
 Purgatory Plot (2010)
 Traitors' World (2010)
 Counterfeit Stars (2010)
 Outworld Invaders (2010)
 Galactic Collapse (2010)

 The Parsina Saga
 Shrine of the Desert Mage (1988)
 The Storyteller and the Jann (1988)
 Crystals of Air and Water (1989)
 Treachery of the Demon King (2002)
 The Rehumanization of Jade Darcy (with Mary Mason):
 Jade Darcy and the Affair of Honor (1988)
 Jade Darcy and the Zen Pirates (1990)
 The Mindsaga
 Mindflight (1978)
 Mindsearch (2011)

Novels
 Herds (1975)
 Caravan (1975)
 Scavenger Hunt (1976)
 Finish Line (1976)
 Assault on the Gods (1977)
 Trek to Madworld (Star Trek)   (1979)
 The Eternity Brigade (1980)
 A World Called Solitude (1981)
 And Not Make Dreams Your Master (1981)
 Crossroads of the Galaxy (1999)
 Polly! (2008)
 Quiet Post (2014)
 Into The Out (2016)

Collections
 The Last Ghost and Other Stories (collection) (1999)
 Star Rooks (2004 - ebook only) (with Kathleen Sky)
 Alien Murders (2009)
 Angel in Black (2010)

Anthologies (editor)
 Protostars (1971) (with David Gerrold)
 The Alien Condition (1973)

Nonfiction
 An Hour with Kathleen Sky (cassette audiobook) (1979) (with Kathleen Sky)
 The Business of Being a Writer (1982) (with Kathleen Sky)

References

External links
 Author's website

1947 births
Living people
American science fiction writers
American fantasy writers
Writers from California
Writers from Philadelphia
Science fiction editors
20th-century American novelists
21st-century American novelists
American male novelists
American speculative fiction editors
20th-century American male writers
21st-century American male writers
Novelists from Pennsylvania